Robinson: Love Edition was the sixteenth season of Expedition Robinson, the Swedish version of Survivor, and the first to air on Sjuan. Linda Lindorff, the host of Robinson 2009, returned to host this season. Fitting with the season's theme, all contestants were single people between the ages of 20 and 42, the tribes were initially divided by gender, and a pair composed of one man and one woman won the season.

Format
The season featured several changes to the game structure in accordance with the theme, the most notable being that a pair—one man and one woman—will win the game, marking the first season in any Survivor franchise with multiple winners by design. As an additional twist, instead of being immediately eliminated from the game, voted out contestants would go to the Garden of Eden instead, to compete against other eliminated contestants for a chance to return to the game. The Garden of Eden features one male and one female contestant—Adam and Eve, respectively—at a time, who will compete in a duel against the latest person of their gender eliminated. At a predetermined point in the game, the remaining Adam and Eve will return to the game. The Garden of Eden is reminiscent of Utopia from the sixth and seventh seasons.

Before the merge, in order to get to know each other better, the tribes would spend the day following the Immunity Challenge together in the Blue Lagoon. The season also included a new challenge, the Amulet Challenge, taking place between the members of the tribe that won that cycle's Immunity Challenge. The three winners of the Amulet Challenge would spend the rest of the day with the losing tribe, and each get to give one member of the other tribe immunity from that night's Tribal Council. The Amulet Challenge was discontinued at the merge.

The format changed once the tribes were merged, at which point the remaining castaways competed in opposite-gender pairs. At the start of each cycle, the gender with fewer remaining players competed to determine their draft order. As the draft was always done with an odd number of players remaining, the leftover castaway was sent to the Garden of Eden. The pair that won each Immunity Challenge also earned the right to give immunity to a single player for the subsequent Tribal Council, while both members of the last-placed team were given a penalty vote; in the case the penalized contestant was given immunity by the challenge winners, their penalty vote was nullified. The vote was individual, with contestants voting by themselves and for one contestant, thus ensuring an odd number of contestants remaining for the next partner draft. The format also changed at the Garden of Eden, as the duels were competed in opposite-gender pairs as well.

Contestants

Partner history

Season summary
There would be two winners this season: One man and one woman. Everyone competed individually but the structure was designed so that the number of men and women were always equal. All contestants were young singles. There were two tribes of six, divided by gender. The losing tribe went to tribal council, as usual, but the winning tribe competed in a separate challenge to decide who would get to hand immunity to players in the losing tribe.
In the women's tribe, Denice made a pact with Jennifer and Mia, primarily to take out Melissa Miller who was good at everything but didn't gel with the rest of the group. Everyone else disagreed with pact-making and wanted to break Denice's pact. Even the men worked to break the pact by distributing immunity to Melissa every time.
Players scouted for potential partners of the other gender. Melissa formed a bond with Richard, which was the only romance in the season, but it didn't last long as Richard was blindsided. Many women wanted to work with Dan, a charismatic and athletic man.
Each time a player was voted out, a new player took their place. Fresh players kept coming into the game to replace those voted out, even two weeks into the game.
Despite officially opposing Denice's pact, three men formed an alliance of their own. The alliance was led by Kalle, joined by Dan and an under-the-radar guy. They threw a challenge to vote off Pontus, a muscular soldier, who was the biggest threat.
After a few tribe swaps, the tribes merged. Players had to compete in immunity challenges as pairs. Before each immunity challenge, the gender with the fewest members competed for order of priority. The winner picked first from among the other gender, forming partners for the immunity challenge. That meant one person was not picked each time and they were eliminated. A campaign against Denice succeeded and she was not picked in the first round. However, her two alliance members remained to the final because they were selected as partners by the men of Kalle's pact. Dan and Melissa picked each other every time, forming a strong challenge partnership. They were often targeted but they were protected by Kalle's alliance.
Kalle made false alliances with multiple additional partners and they all fell for it. His alliance kept voting out men to maintain control of the game, thus disallowing women from picking partners. Their respective female partners were just appendages for most of the game. However, in the final six, Jennifer convinced the men to vote off a woman and that allowed her to stir things up. She wanted to break up Dan and Melissa because she thought they would win the potential final. Having the first pick because of her challenge win, Jennifer picked Dan as partner, forcing Melissa to pick Kalle. Having split up Dan and Melissa, Jennifer took control of the game and voted out Melissa. Thus, Kalle was also eliminated as no woman was left to pick him. Dan then had no choice but to play the rest of the game with Jennifer.
Players who were voted out or not picked as partners went to Garden of Eden, a separate island with room for one man and one woman, challenged by each newcomer. Since their respective eliminations, Denice and Pontus won every challenge, returning to the game. They qualified for the final alongside Dan and Jennifer who then won the jury vote by a landslide. The jury seemed to dislike the route that Pontus and Denice took to the final.

Game history

External links
http://www.tv4.se/robinson

 2015 Love Edition